Oberea histrionis is a species of beetle in the family Cerambycidae. It was described by Maurice Pic in 1917. It is known from Hungary, the Czech Republic, Slovakia, Moldova, Austria, and Ukraine. It feeds on Euphorbia lucida.

References

histrionis
Beetles described in 1917